Tracks on Wax 4 is the fourth album by Welsh rock musician Dave Edmunds. The record was the first Edmunds solo effort to feature all four members of the band Rockpile: Edmunds, Billy Bremner (who also wrote two of the album's songs under the pen name Billy Murray), Nick Lowe, and Terry Williams.

The album's eighth song, "Thread Your Needle", was originally recorded by the Ohio-based R&B duo Dean & Jean (Welton Young and Brenda Lee Jones). The album's final song, "Heart of the City", was originally recorded by Nick Lowe as a Stiff Records single in 1976. A live version performed by Rockpile was released on Lowe's album Jesus of Cool (also 1978) and Edmunds used the same backing track, but overdubbed his own lead vocals in place of Lowe's.

Track listing

Side one
 "Trouble Boys" (Billy Murray)   – 3:02
 "Never Been in Love" (Nick Lowe, Rockpile) – 2:28
 "Not a Woman, Not a Child" (Billy Murray, Ray Peters) – 3:21
 "Television" (Lowe) – 3:19
 "What Looks Best on You" (Lowe, Edmunds) – 2:26
 "Readers Wives" (Noel Brown) – 3:11

Side two
 "Deborah" (Lowe, Edmunds) – 2:38
 "Thread Your Needle" (Brenda Lee Jones, Welton Young) – 3:27
 "A.1. On the Jukebox" (Edmunds, Will Birch) – 3:15
 "It's My Own Business" (Chuck Berry) – 3:56
 "Heart of the City" (Lowe) – 3:03

Personnel
Dave Edmunds – guitar, piano, vocals
Billy Bremner – guitar
Terry Williams – drums
Nick Lowe – bass
Gerry Hogan – pedal steel guitar
Pete Kelly – piano

Charts

Notes

1978 albums
Dave Edmunds albums
Swan Song Records albums
Albums produced by Dave Edmunds